"Baby Baby" is a song originally recorded by English punk rock band the Vibrators.

Recording and release
"Baby Baby" was written by Ian 'Knox' Carnochan, the primary songwriter in UK punk band, the Vibrators. The song was recorded by the Vibrators and released as a single in May 1977. It was their first single released on Epic Records with their previous singles having been released on RAK. The song on the B-side was "Into the Future".

One month later, in June 1977, the song was included in the release of their debut album, Pure Mania. The song was included in a session for John Peel at Radio 1.

The song has since featured on numerous 'best of punk' compilation albums such as Punk: The Early Years and Punk's Not Dead - 30 Years of Punk as well as compilation albums containing only Vibrators tracks.

When Knox was interviewed for Punk77 in 1999 he said, "My favourite Vibrators' song has to be "Baby Baby". I always think when I play it is like being on holiday."

Cover versions
The song has been covered by R.E.M., Forgotten Rebels, Die Toten Hosen and others.

References

1977 singles
British punk rock songs
Rock ballads
Die Toten Hosen songs
1977 songs
Epic Records singles
Virgin Records singles